USS Gudgeon (SS/AGSS/SSAG-567), a , was the second ship of the United States Navy to be named for the gudgeon, a species of small fresh-water minnow.

Construction and commissioning 

The submarine's keel was laid by the Portsmouth Naval Shipyard in Kittery, Maine.  It was launched on 11 June 1952 sponsored by Mrs. Robert A. Bonin, widow of the first Gudgeon's last commanding officer, and commissioned on 21 November 1952 with Commander Robert M. Carroll in command. Gudgeon was the first American submarine to circumnavigate the globe; the navigator aboard this history making voyage was Lt. Leon Leroy Stine, Jr., who died on January 30, 2018.

Service record

After builders' trials, Gudgeon sailed for Pearl Harbor, where it joined Submarine Squadron 1 (SubRon 1), Submarine Division 1 (SubDiv 1), 18 July 1953. Local operations and training exercises continued until 11 April 1954, when Gudgeon sailed to the mainland for antisubmarine warfare (ASW) exercises along the Washington coast. A Mare Island Naval Shipyard overhaul occupied the remainder of the year, and Gudgeon returned to Pearl Harbor 9 March 1955. She sailed 21 Jul 1955, for the first of five WestPac tours, visiting Yokosuka, Formosa, Hong Kong, Manila, and Guam before returning to Pearl Harbor on 30 January 1956. Local operations out of the Hawaiian port, overhaul, special secret operations, and a second voyage to the West Coast took Gudgeon through the next 18 months.

Sailing from Pearl Harbor on 8 July 1957, Gudgeon began a history-making cruise around the world, making the Pacific Fleet Submarine Force's flagship the first American submarine to circumnavigate the globe. The navigator was Lt. Leon L. Stine, Jr. After exercises at Yokosuka, Gudgeon sailed west 26 August 1957. As it made her way around the world for the next six months, the submarine docked at Asian, African and European ports before a triumphal entry into Pearl Harbor 21 February 1958, eight months and 25,000 miles (40,000 km) since taking departure.

During August 1957, after being detected by the Soviet Navy outside the port of Vladivostok, outside the 3-mile territorial waters limit recognized by the US but well inside the 12-mile limit claimed by the Soviets, the Gudgeon was the first US submarine forced to the surface during the Cold War; The navigator was Lt. Leon L. Stine, Jr.

First conversion
After extensive overhaul, Gudgeon again settled into the peacetime local and special operations, training exercises, and ASW activities. Three WestPac cruises, in 1959, 1961, and 1963, took it to Japan for exercises with the Seventh Fleet as well as to the US naval base at Subic Bay in the 
Philippine Islands and Hong Kong for liberty. During the alternate years, 1960 and 1962, Gudgeon was reassigned to mainland waters, training and exercising along the Washington and California coasts.

Second conversion
Gudgeon returned from the Far East to Pearl Harbor 1 August 1963, and for the next two years operated in Hawaiian waters. It departed Pearl Harbor 29 November and arrived San Francisco, California, on 9 December for overhaul at Mare Island. The ship was cut in half and an 18-foot (5 meter) section was added during a conversion which gave the submarine new and larger engines as well as the Passive Underwater Fire Control Feasibility System (PUFFS) passive sonar installation. Modernization was completed during April 1967 and Gudgeon returned to duty in the Pacific Fleet.

[1967-1983]

Gudgeon was reclassified a miscellaneous auxiliary submarine, AGSS-567 and later SSAG-567 during November 1979.

Gudgeon served in the Pacific until it was decommissioned on 30 September 1983 and eliminated from the Naval Vessel Register on 6 August 1987.

Awards

 China Service Medal
 National Defense Service Medal with star (2 awards)
 Armed Forces Expeditionary Medal
 Vietnam Service Medal with two campaign stars for Vietnam War service

TCG Hızırreis (S 342) 

During 1983, Gudgeon was transferred by lease to Turkey and renamed TCG Hızırreis (S 342), named for Ottoman Admiral Kurtoğlu Hızır Reis. It was purchased in 1987, served until 2004, and is presently berthed as a museum ship at the Kocaeli Museum Ships Command  in Izmit and is open to the public.

References

External links 
navsource.org: USS Gudgeon
 hazegray.org: USS Gudgeon
"Life on the Gudgeon, a Navy Fast Attack Submarine", additional photographs of the USS Gudgeon

United States Tang-class submarines
Ships built in Kittery, Maine
1952 ships
Cold War submarines of the United States
Ships transferred from the United States Navy to the Turkish Navy
United States Tang-class submarines of the Turkish Navy
Museum ships in Turkey
Buildings and structures in İzmit
Museums in Kocaeli Province